The 2022 Pro-Line 225  was a NASCAR Pinty's Series race that was held on June 26, 2022. Originally scheduled to be held on June 25, it was pushed back due to rain. It was contested over 225 laps on the  oval. It was the 4th race of the 2022 NASCAR Pinty's Series season, as well as the inaugural race at the Eastbound International Speedway. Marc-Antoine Camirand collected his first victory of the season, and the third of his career.

Report

Entry list 

 (R) denotes rookie driver.
 (i) denotes driver who is ineligible for series driver points.

Practice/Qualifying

Practice/Qualifying results

Race 

Laps: 225

Race statistics 

 Lead changes:  7
 Cautions/Laps: 11 for 51 laps
 Time of race: 1:32.43
 Average speed: 54.602

References 

2022 NASCAR Pinty's Series
Pro-Line 225